Russia competed at the 2013 World Games held in Cali, Colombia.

Medalists

Ju-jitsu

Karate 

Olga Malofeeva won the bronze medal in the women's kumite 61 kg event.

Powerlifting 

Three gold medals, two silver medals and two bronze medals were won.

References 

Nations at the 2013 World Games
2013 in Russian sport
2013